Marc H. Ellis (born 1952) is an American author, liberation theologian, and a retired University Professor of Jewish Studies, Professor of History and Director of the Center for Jewish Studies at Baylor University. He is currently visiting professor of several international universities, including the University of Innsbruck, Austria and the United Nations University for Peace, Costa Rica.

Biography
Ellis was raised as a Jew, and attended Orthodox and Conservative synagogues in his youth. Later he became a member of the Catholic Worker Movement in 1974-1975, but has continued to identify as Jewish throughout his life. He wrote an autobiographical book (1997) Unholy alliance: religion and atrocity in our time. He earned B.A. and M.A. degrees in Religion and American Studies at Florida State University, where he studied under Richard Rubenstein and William Miller. In 1980 he received his doctorate in contemporary American Social and Religious Thought from Marquette University. He then became a faculty member at the Maryknoll School of Theology in Maryknoll, New York, and director of the M.A. program at the Maryknoll Institute for Justice and Peace. He was made full professor in 1988, and remained at Maryknoll until 1995. He was a Senior Fellow and then visiting scholar at Harvard Divinity School's Center for the Study of World Religions and Harvard University's Center for Middle Eastern Studies, as well as a visiting professor at Florida State University. In 1998 he was appointed Professor of American and Jewish Studies at Baylor University, where the next year he was named University Professor of American and Jewish Studies. In 1999 he founded Baylor University's Center for American and Jewish Studies. In 2006, the Center was renamed The Center for Jewish Studies.

His current writings deal with contemporary Judaism, Jewish liberation theology, Jewish-Arab relations, justice, and peace.
 
Ellis retired from Baylor University in 2012 and is currently visiting professor of international universities such as the United Nations mandated University for Peace in Costa Rica and the University of Innsbruck, Austria.

Among those who have commented positively on the work of Ellis are George McGovern, Noam Chomsky, Edward Said, Professor Susannah Heschel, Elliot Dorff and Desmund Tutu.

Ellis's departure from Baylor was controversial as he and his supporters, including Cornel West, Rosemary Ruether, and Desmond Tutu, stated that a concerted effort was made to remove him due to his views on Israeli-Palestinian relations. Baylor President Ken Starr and the university administration denied that Ellis was being targeted for his views but that the investigation had to do with privacy rules. Ellis responded that the privacy rules he was charged with violating were selectively enforced.

Bibliography
 Ellis, M.H. (2016) "Foreword" in Hamed, Adham (2016): Speaking the Unspeakable: Sounds of the Middle East Conflict. Wiesbaden, Verlag Springer. 
 Ellis, M. H. (2014) Burning Children - A Jewish View of the War in Gaza."
 Ellis, M. H. (2011) Encountering the Jewish Future: with Wiesel, Buber, Heschel, Arendt, Levinas. Augsburg Fortress 
 Ellis, M. H. (2009) Judaism Does Not Equal Israel:  The Rebirth of the Jewish Prophetic. New Press 
 Ellis, M. H. (2007) Reading the Torah Out Loud:  A Journey of Lament and Hope. Ellis, M. H. (2005) The End of Jewish History : Auschwitz, The Holocaust and Palestine. .
 Ellis, M. H. (2005) After Arafat: mapping a Jewish/Palestinian solidarity. ASIN B000AJQKUU.
 Ellis, M. H., & Neuberger, J.(preface) (2004) Toward a Jewish Theology of Liberation: The Challenge of the 21st Century. .
 Ellis, M. H. (2004) The Mural-Covered Wall: On Separation and the Future of Jews and Palestinians in Israel/Palestine and the Diaspora. ASIN B000BG5DE6.
 Ellis, M. H. (2003) At the end of an era: a meditation on ecumenism, exile and gratitude. ASIN B0008DMKHA.
 Ellis, M. H. (2002) Israel and Palestine - Out of the Ashes: The Search for Jewish Identity in the Twenty-first Century. .
 Ellis, M. H. (2001) Practicing Exile: The Religious Odyssey of an American Jew. .
 Ellis, M. H. (2000) Revolutionary Forgiveness: Essays on Judaism, Christianity, and the Future of religious Life. .
 Ellis, M. H. (2000) A Year at the Catholic Worker: A Spiritual Journey Among the Poor. 
 Ellis, M. H.(2000) Indigenous minority rights, citizenship, and the new Jerusalem: a reflection on the future of Palestinians and Jews in the expanded state of Israel. ASIN B0008HBG4E.
 Ellis, M. H. (1999) O Jerusalem: The Contested Future of the Jewish Covenant. .
 McGowan, D., & Ellis, M. H. (1998) Remembering Deir Yassin: The Future of Israel and Palestine. .
 Ellis, M. H. (1997) Unholy Alliance: Religion and Atrocity in Our Time. .
 Ellis, M. H. (1995) Restoring the ordinary: A reflection on the consciousness of the Holocaust in Jewish thought in the aftermath of the Israeli-Palestinian accords. ASIN B0006QR1E6.
 Ellis, M. H.(1994) Ending Auschwitz: The Future of Jewish and Christian Life. .
 Ellis, M. H. (1990) Beyond Innocence and redemption: Confronting the Holocaust and Israeli Power; Creating a Moral Future for the Jewish People. .
 Ellis, M. H. (1990) Expanding the View: Gustavo Gutierrez and the Future of Liberation Theology. .
 Ellis, M. H. (1989) The Future of Dissent: a Reflection on What Shall I Do With This People? Jews and the Fractious Politics of Judaism. ASIN B00082AJUG.
 Ellis, M. H. (1987)  Toward a Jewish Theology of Liberation Orbis Books, Maryknoll, New York, 
 Ellis, M. H. (1986) Faithfulness in an Age of Holocaust. .
 Ellis, M. H. (1981) Peter Maurin: Prophet in the twentieth century.'' .

See also
American philosophy
List of American philosophers
Supreme crime

References

Further reading
 Can Jews abroad rescue Israel?
 My heavy heart at Passover
 On the Rabbis and the Future of Jewish Life
 
 Walling off the covenant: Jewish identity in the 21st century
 The Ongoing Nakba and the Jewish Conscience: A presentation given at the Palestine Center

1952 births
Jewish American writers
American Jewish theologians
Baylor University faculty
Florida State University alumni
Harvard University staff
Living people
Writers from Miami
Liberation theologians
Marquette University alumni
Florida State University faculty